The 5th Ranger Infantry Company (Airborne) was an airborne trained light infantry unit of the United States Army during the Korean War. The 5th Rangers were trained by 3rd Ranger Company as part of the second cycle of Ranger companies at Fort Benning, Georgia, which also included the 6th, 7th, and 8th Ranger Companies. The 5th Rangers also received winter training at Fort Carson, Colorado.

The 5th Rangers were assigned to the US Army's 25th Infantry Division from April 31, 1951, to its inactivation on August 1, 1951.

References 

Ranger companies of the United States Army